Chicken lollipop is a popular Indian fried chicken appetiser. Chicken lollipop is, essentially a frenched chicken winglet, wherein the meat is cut loose from the bone end and pushed down creating a lollipop appearance.

Recipe
Recipes vary from individuals. However, many start by using the middle segment of the chicken wing or thigh. The middle segment has one of the two bones removed, and the flesh on the segments is pushed to one end of the bone. These are then coated in a spicy red batter whose main ingredients include red chili powder, and turmeric. The coated chicken is then marinated for a couple of hours. The marinated chicken is usually deep fried in oil, but another well-known choice includes baking. The exposed bone is sometimes wrapped in aluminum foil.

See also

 List of hors d'oeuvre
 Buffalo wing
 Swiss wing

External links

References

Deep fried foods
Appetizers
Indian cuisine
Indian chicken dishes
Pakistani chicken dishes
Indo-Caribbean cuisine